Amy Elizabeth Stoch is an American actress and academic, also known as Amy Stock and Amy Stock-Poynton.

Life and career
Stoch was born and raised in Cleveland, Ohio, and wanted to be an actress from a young age. She had her break when she reached the semifinals in the spokesmodel category on the television show Star Search, and one of the show's judges, Sue Cameron, offered to represent her.

In 1986, she played Britta Englund, a former KGB agent who was involved in a love triangle with Patch Johnson and Bo Brady, on Days of Our Lives. There, she met actor Robert Poynton, who played John Black. They married in 1987 and had a son, Robert Andrew Poynton V  but divorced in 2004.

In 1987, she played a recurring role in a major story arc on Dallas as Lisa Alden, the biological aunt of Christopher Ewing. She played Missy, the sexy stepmother of Bill and later Ted, in Bill & Ted's Excellent Adventure, and its sequels Bill & Ted's Bogus Journey and Bill & Ted Face the Music. Stoch also appeared in four television movies of the Gunsmoke series, as Marshal Matt Dillon's daughter Beth, and made guest appearances on Matlock, The Fall Guy, Hardcastle and McCormick, Dynasty, Knots Landing, and High Incident, among others. She also played Fawn Hall in the miniseries, Guts and Glory: The Rise and Fall of Oliver North.

Academia
Stoch holds a bachelor of arts in theatre from Ashland University, and a master's from California State University, Northridge.

In 2012, she completed a PhD in theatre History, theory, and criticism from the University of Illinois at Urbana–Champaign.

Currently, she teaches critical studies courses at AMDA College for the Performing Arts in Los Angeles.

Filmography

References

External links
 

Living people
Actresses from Cleveland
20th-century American actresses
21st-century American actresses
American television actresses
American film actresses
Ashland University alumni
California State University, Northridge alumni
University of Illinois Urbana-Champaign alumni
Year of birth missing (living people)